Gnomonia comari is a fungus on overwintered leaves of Comarum palustre L. (Rosaceae). The fungus has been recently referred to Gnomoniopsis comari (Karst.) Sogonov, comb. nov. It occurs in Europe (Finland, Germany, Switzerland)  It causes a disease on strawberry.

See also
 List of strawberry diseases

References

Fungal plant pathogens and diseases
Fungal strawberry diseases
Gnomoniaceae
Fungi described in 1873